Drumquin Wolfe Tones is a Gaelic Athletic Association club. The club is Drumquin, County Tyrone, Ulster.

The club is a Gaelic football. The Club fields its own teams for all age groups from Under-6s to seniors. The females Ladies Gaelic football in Drumquin carry the same Wolfe Tones name and play at the same home venue. 
All Drumquin youth  the club has girls teams playing at Under-6, Under-8 , Under-10, Under-12 & Under-14 level. After a ten year gap without a Senior Ladies Team, 2019 saw the Drumquin Wolfe Tones LGFA team Re-Formed to compete in the Junior grade.

The senior team in 2019 will compete in Division 3 of the Tyrone All-County Football League and will play in the Tyrone Junior Football Championship.

Honours
 1946- Davis Cup
 1960- Tyrone Minor Football League 
 1981- Scor County Title
 1982- Scor County Title, Division 3 Tyrone Football League and Tyrone Under-14 Football Cup
 1984- Tyrone Reserve Football Championship
 1985- Promotion from Division 3 Tyrone Football League
 1994- Tyrone Intermediate Football Championship 
 1998- Tyrone Ladies Football Championship
 2000- Tyrone Grade 3 Minor Football League
 2001- Promotion to Division 1B Tyrone Football League
 2002- Tyrone Division 1B Football League Title
 2003- Tyrone Reserve Football League
 2005- Promotion to Division 1B Tyrone Football League
 2012- Tyrone Under-13 Grade 4 League Title
 2014- Tyrone Under-16 Grade 4 Championship
 2018- Tyrone Under-14 Grade 4 Football League & Tyrone Under-14 Football Championship (Double Winners)
 2018- Tyrone Minor Grade 4 Football League & Tyrone Minor Football Championship (Double Winners)

Facilities
In 1977 the club purchased an 11-acre (4.45-hectare) site from a local lad Chesty OKane fora tenner and developed it into what now known as Jim McGirr Park. The current spectator stand was built in the 1991. The next development was in 1999, when in September the new clubrooms were opened by County Chairman at the time, Cuthbert Donnelly M.B.E. The cost for the new building was approximately £220000. A second pitch was also leased to the club from Omagh District Council for 999 years. The main playing field was the next phase of development, which saw a sand and velvet carpet pitch being laid and grass seeds sown in October 2005. This also saw a 5 m (14 ft)-high perimeter fence erection; and goal post, bald-stops and a turnstyle being built.

Gaelic games clubs in County Tyrone
Gaelic football clubs in County Tyrone